Robert Hrgota (born 2 August 1988) is a Slovenian ski jumper.

Career
Hrgota made his international debut in a Fis Race in Villach 2004. In 2006 he finished in the eighth place in Junior World Championships in Kranj. In 2007 in Westby, Hrgota competed in the Ski jumping Continental Cup, where he finished in the third place. 2007 in Tarvisio he won the Junior World Championships team competition together with the others in the Slovenian team. In the summer 2008 Hrgota finished in the second place in Ski jumping Continental Cup. The competition was in Velenje, Hrgota's hometown.

References

1988 births
Living people
Slovenian male ski jumpers
Sportspeople from Celje